Robert Francis Peel  (30 April 1874 – 10 August 1924) was an English soldier, Conservative politician and Governor of Saint Helena from 1920 until his death in 1924.

He was the grandson of William Yates Peel, great-grandson of Sir Robert Peel and a great-nephew of Prime Minister Sir Robert Peel. He attended Harrow School.

Peel was commissioned as a second lieutenant in the Coldstream Guards on 2 February 1898, and promoted to lieutenant on 1 April 1899. He served with the 1st battalion of the regiment in South Africa during the Second Boer War, and returned with his regiment in July 1902, following the end of the war. He was promoted captain in 1906. After retiring from the regular army in 1909, he was commissioned Major in the part-time 4th (Special Reserve) Battalion, the East Surrey Regiment, becoming a Lieutenant Colonel in March 1913. He continued to serve during the First World War, gaining the rank of brevet Colonel.

In 1903, Peel married Alice Charlton-Meyrick, daughter of Sir Thomas Charlton-Meyrick.

After failing to get elected for Mid Northamptonshire in the 1906 general election, Peel served as Member of Parliament for Woodbridge, Suffolk from January 1910. In July 1920, he resigned his seat to become Governor and Commander-in-Chief of St Helena. In June 1922 he was appointed a companion of the Order of St Michael and St George. He continued to serve as governor until his death on 10 August 1924.

There is a memorial plaque to Peel in the East Surrey Regimental Chapel in All Saints Church, Kingston upon Thames, Surrey.

References

External links 
 

1874 births
1924 deaths
UK MPs 1910
UK MPs 1910–1918
UK MPs 1918–1922
Coldstream Guards officers
Conservative Party (UK) MPs for English constituencies
Governors of Saint Helena
British colonial governors and administrators in Africa
Companions of the Order of St Michael and St George
People educated at Harrow School
East Surrey Regiment officers